The 1955 Detroit Tigers season was a season in American baseball. The team finished fifth in the American League with a record of 79–75, 17 games behind the New York Yankees.

Al Kaline became the youngest major league player to win the American League (AL) batting title at 20 years old which still stands to this day. He hit .340 for the season, 21 points better than runner-up Vic Power.

Offseason 
 December 6, 1954: Walt Dropo, Ted Gray and Bob Nieman were traded by the Tigers to the Chicago White Sox for Leo Cristante, Ferris Fain, and Jack Phillips.

Regular season

Season standings

Record vs. opponents

Roster

Player stats

Batting

Starters by position 
Note: Pos = Position; G = Games played; AB = At bats; H = Hits; Avg. = Batting average; HR = Home runs; RBI = Runs batted in

Other batters 
Note: G = Games played; AB = At bats; H = Hits; Avg. = Batting average; HR = Home runs; RBI = Runs batted in

Pitching

Starting pitchers 
Note: G = Games pitched; IP = Innings pitched; W = Wins; L = Losses; ERA = Earned run average; SO = Strikeouts

Other pitchers 
Note: G = Games pitched; IP = Innings pitched; W = Wins; L = Losses; ERA = Earned run average; SO = Strikeouts

Relief pitchers 
Note: G = Games pitched; W = Wins; L = Losses; SV = Saves; ERA = Earned run average; SO = Strikeouts

Farm system 

LEAGUE CHAMPIONS: Panama City

References

Further reading

External links 
1955 Detroit Tigers season at Baseball Reference

Detroit Tigers seasons
Detroit Tigers season
Detroit Tigers
1955 in Detroit